The Tom and Jerry Cartoon Kit is a Tom and Jerry animated short film, produced and released on August 10, 1962. It was the ninth cartoon in a series of thirteen to be directed by Gene Deitch and produced by William L. Snyder in Czechoslovakia. It updates its copyright to the current year 1962 as opposed to the 1961 copyright of Dicky Moe.

The Tom and Jerry Cartoon Kit is a sarcastic attack on the series as a whole and its formulaic approach, which the short mocks as excessively violent and designed solely for profit. Deitch had strongly divergent views on animation compared to Tom and Jerrys creators, William Hanna and Joseph Barbera, that he openly expressed throughout his lifetime.

Plot
The cartoon begins with a demonstration for the Tom and Jerry Cartoon Kit, with which "anyone can now enter the lucrative field of animated cartoons." The items in the kit include the following:
 "One mean, stupid cat" (Tom)
 "One sweet, lovable mouse" (Jerry)
 "Assorted deadly weapons" (a knife, a hammer, and a stick of dynamite)
 Coffee and cigarettes (removed from the kit and described as being "for the cartoonists")
 A slice of watermelon

The narrator says, "First, put the sweet, lovable mouse into a simple situation expressing a natural human need, such as eating a slice of watermelon contained in our kit. The result may not make sense, but it will last long enough for you to be comfortably seated before the feature begins." This statement refers to the original theatrical exhibition of the cartoon, which ran ahead of a feature film.

At first, Jerry eats the watermelon on the table and spits the seeds out, hitting and waking Tom, who initially grabs the hammer to attempt to hit Jerry but instead flicks him in the back of his head. Jerry swallows the seeds by accident, causing him to turn green for a moment and then make sounds like a shaker when he moves and goes into a lively dance until Tom traps him in a metal can. Tom uses Jerry as a maraca for his own dance; when the effect suddenly stops, Tom confusingly peeks inside only to get a mouthful of seeds spat into his face. He gets outraged and devours the rest of the watermelon and turns his head into a cannon to fire blasts of seeds at Jerry, who takes cover in the kit box just before Tom hits it, blowing up the stick of dynamite and destroying the box.

After a very close call from Jerry after a knife lands next to his tail, Jerry winds up lying beneath a book named Judo for Mice, studies it, and emerges with enough fighting skill to easily overpower Tom. Not even a stint of training at a boxing gym and use of the knife can give Tom any advantage against Jerry. Finally, after recovering from a nasty spinup from Jerry, Tom goes to a judo school in order to face him again. After finishing his duties, the two began a breaking contest, in which each tries to outdo the other: Jerry with a wooden board, Tom with a brick, then Jerry again with a cement block. The contest ends abruptly when Tom tries to break a massive block of heavy marble. As the weight of which proves too much for the support bricks to hold, he crashes through the floor and takes him with it.

An unconscious Tom ends up in the battered box. Jerry replaces the lid as the narrator pipes up, "Our next film will be for the kiddies, and will demonstrate a new poison gas. Thank you and good night." The words on the lid say "The End, An MGM Cartoon" like an ending typical of a Deitch Tom and Jerry short. The music winds to stop as if it was being played on a slowing phonograph record and Jerry bows to the audience in typical Japanese fashion. As the gong sounded, making the screen faded to black.

Reception
While the Deitch shorts were generally negatively received by Tom and Jerry fans, this particular short is often considered one of the best of the thirteen cartoons, due to its inventive plotline and satirical nature.

See also
 List of American films of 1962

References

External links

 
 

1962 films
1962 short films
Films directed by Gene Deitch
Tom and Jerry short films
1960s American animated films
1962 comedy films
Self-reflexive films
1962 animated films
Metro-Goldwyn-Mayer short films
Metro-Goldwyn-Mayer animated short films
Rembrandt Films short films
1960s English-language films